The Ocean Financial Centre is an office building located at Collyer Quay in the Raffles Place region of Downtown Core planning area, Singapore. It is built on the site of the former Ocean Building, which has been demolished. The new building retained the name and many of the tenants of the former office block, and will serve primarily as a home to financial corporations.

The building features a large solar array and is located next to Raffles Place MRT station.

On 17 October 2011, K-REIT Asia acquired the building from Keppel Land for more than S$2 billion.

Ocean Financial Centre used to house the Honorary Consulate of Cyprus on the 37th floor of the building.

Gallery

References

External links

Ocean Financial Centre – an unofficial news site.

2011 establishments in Singapore
Downtown Core (Singapore)
Marina Bay, Singapore
Office buildings completed in 2011
Skyscraper office buildings in Singapore